The Salvation Army, Australia Eastern Territory or (AUE) was one of two administrative territories that The Salvation Army was divided into within Australia and covered 2 states and 1 Australian territory on the east coast of the country. The AUE was geographically sub-divided into 2 divisions, under different Divisional Commanders, each reporting directly to the Territorial Commander.  Its headquarters was located at 261-265 Chalmers St, Redfern NSW 2016.

On Friday 30 November 2018, General Brian Peddle announced that the Southern Territory and Eastern Territory were reunited and The Salvation Army in Australia would again be one territory.

History

The Salvation Army in Australia, was not originally separated into two Territories, but existed administratively as one. It was known as The Australasian Territory from 1880 until it was renamed The Australian Territory in 1907, which it remained until the split into two territories in 1921.

Whilst the territory as a whole came into being in 1880, the Army's work did not spread to New South Wales until 4 December 1882, and to Queensland in 1885, these states now, along with the Australian Capital Territory (which was founded in 1938) make up the AUE. All remaining states and the Northern Territory are part of The Salvation Army, Australia Southern Territory.

Commissioners James Condon and Floyd Tidd announced in 2015 that the two territories would be reunited over a three-year period through the Australia One project.

Structure
Until 2015, The Salvation Army in Australia did not have a National Commander, as other territories may, but rather, each of its two Territories is responsible to International Headquarters (IHQ).
As of 2015, Commissioner Floyd Tidd was appointed as National Commander, and each of the two territories were appointed a Chief-Secretary-In-Charge during the Australia One unification process.  Once this process has completed, the peak role within the territory will revert to the title of Territorial Commander.

The Territorial Commander (TC) and Chief Secretary are appointed by The General, their role is to oversee and administer the work of The Salvation Army within the Territory, they are assisted by various other Secretaries (departmental heads) who are, in turn, responsible for overseeing their various branches of Army activity.

The TC is responsible for the Army's overall operation and mission, and the Chief Secretary is responsible for the territory's administration and daily operations. Senior executive Officers are, on the recommendation of the Territorial Commander, also appointed by the General.

All other Officer appointments within a Territory are the responsibility of the Territorial Commander and The Cabinet. This Cabinet refers to the territory's administrative System. The five member Administrative Cabinet – similar to a Board – determines policy and strategy for the Territory, particularly as it relates to the future.

Divisions

The AUE is further broken up into smaller administrative regions called Divisions, controlled by a Divisional Headquarters (or DHQ) and headed by a Divisional Commander. The AUE is broken up into two divisions with the DHQ located in the state capital cities:

Music

The AUE is home to many Salvation Army musical sections, at Corps, Divisional and Territorial levels. Some groups of note include the Sydney Staff Songsters (Territorial), The Sydney Youth Band (Divisional). This territory is also well known for having many Salvation Army Bands, a list of which is found here.

Australian sex abuse cases
The investigation also examined The Salvation Army's processes in investigating, disciplining, removing and/or transferring anyone accused of, or found to have engaged in, child sexual abuse in these homes. On 27 March 2014, the Royal Commission began an investigation into the handling by The Salvation Army (Eastern Territory) of claims of child sexual abuse between 1993 and 2014.

The Royal Commission published a case study report on the findings and recommendations for one of the abovementioned case studies.

Notable officers from or that served in the Territory

General Eva Burrows
General George Carpenter
General John Gowans
Brigadier Arthur McIlveen
General Linda Bond

See also
The Salvation Army in Australia
The Salvation Army, Australia Southern Territory
The Salvation Army, Parramatta
The Salvation Army, Sydney Congress Hall

References

External links
salvos.org.au

Salvation Army, Australia Eastern Territory
Religious organizations established in 1878
1878 establishments in Australia